Marcy Correctional Facility is a medium-security state prison for males in Marcy, Oneida County, New York. To some extent Marcy specializes in providing alcohol and drug treatment programs. All of Marcy is on one level; there are no stairs, making it especially suitable for disabled prisoners. It also has a higher-than-average number of vocational programs. One building was built with "classrooms" for lessons in how to clean an office and a toilet (with working toilet), lay bricks, repair electrical devices, and the like. It has a full-sized football field surrounded by a track. The biggest room at the prison is the basketball court, also used, with portable chairs and tables, for presentations. The gym has a large waiting area, benches in a room.

The prison is located across the street from  the Central New York Psychiatric Center, where incarcerated prisoners from state and local jurisdictions can be held and treated, and the Mid-State Correctional Facility. A separate medium security housing unit, the Residential Mental Health Unit (RMHU), is located within Marcy.  The RMHU unit houses inmates with lengthy disciplinary sanctions who also suffer with severe mental health issues.  The RMHU unit has its own fence that separates it from the rest of the facility. Midstate and Marcy are on opposite sides of the highway, and as both are set back from the road, it is easily  mile between the two prisons' gates. The Psychiatric Center houses sex offenders civilly committed.

References

External links  
 Marcy CF information
 New York Prison Families Support Group

Prisons in New York (state)
Buildings and structures in Oneida County, New York
Civil commitment of sex offenders
1989 establishments in New York (state)